The Rowland J. Darnell House is a historic mansion in Memphis, Tennessee, United States. It was built in 1907 for Rowland Jones Darnell, a lumber dealer from the North. By 1917, it had been acquired by the hardware dealer A. R. Orgill, followed by another hardware dealer named Leslie Martin Stratton from 1919 to 1924. It was purchased by The Nineteenth Century Club in 1926.

The house was designed in the Colonial Revival architectural style, with Beaux Arts features. It has been listed on the National Register of Historic Places since March 26, 1979.

References

Houses on the National Register of Historic Places in Tennessee
Colonial Revival architecture in Tennessee
Beaux-Arts architecture in Tennessee
Houses completed in 1907
Houses in Memphis, Tennessee